Alasana Manneh (born 8 April 1998) is a Gambian professional footballer who plays for Danish Superliga club Odense Boldklub as a midfielder.

Career

Barcelona
Born in Banjul, Manneh joined FC Barcelona's youth setup in 2016, from Aspire Academy. In July 2017 he was promoted to the reserves.

Sabadell (loan)
On 22 August 2017, Manneh was loaned to Segunda División B side CE Sabadell FC. He made his senior debut on 28 October, starting and scoring the first in a 2–0 away win against UE Llagostera.

Etar (loan)
On 23 January 2018, Manneh moved to Bulgarian side Etar Veliko Tarnovo, also on a temporary deal. Manneh made his debut for Etar on 17 February 2018, starting in a 3–3 home draw against Septemvri Sofia. His first professional goal came on 8 March, as he scored the equalizer in a 1–2 away loss against CSKA Sofia.

Górnik Zabrze
In July 2019 Manneh signed a contract with Polish club Górnik Zabrze.

Odense
On the transfer deadline day, 31 August 2022, Manneh was transferred to Danish Superliga club Odense, joining them on a three-year contract.

International career
Manneh made his full international debut for the Gambia national team on 30 May 2016, coming on as a substitute in a 0–0 friendly draw against Zambia.

Career statistics

Club

National team

References

External links
 
 
 

1998 births
Living people
People from Banjul
Gambian footballers
Association football midfielders
Segunda División B players
First Professional Football League (Bulgaria) players
Ekstraklasa players
III liga players

FC Barcelona players
FC Barcelona Atlètic players
CE Sabadell FC footballers
SFC Etar Veliko Tarnovo players
Górnik Zabrze players
Odense Boldklub players
The Gambia international footballers
Gambian expatriate footballers
Gambian expatriate sportspeople in Spain
Gambian expatriate sportspeople in Bulgaria
Gambian expatriate sportspeople in Poland
Gambian expatriate sportspeople in Denmark
Expatriate footballers in Spain
Expatriate footballers in Bulgaria
Expatriate footballers in Poland
Expatriate men's footballers in Denmark